The tooth-to-tail ratio (T3R), in military jargon, is the amount of military personnel it takes to supply and support ("tail") each combat soldier ("tooth"). While both "tooth" and "tail" soldiers may find themselves in combat or other life-threatening situations, and both may spend much time in non-combat duties, "tooth" soldiers are those whose primary function is to engage in combat. The ratio is not a specific measure but rather a general indication of a force's might in relation to the resources it devotes to supply, upkeep, and logistics. It may be measured for an entire national military, a single branch, a theater of operations, or down to individual formations.

Description

Tooth-to-tail ratio is often inversely related to its technological capabilities and subsequently its overall power. While a force with a high tooth-to-tail ratio will have more personnel devoted to combat, these soldiers will lack the support provided by the tail. Such support includes the logistics and communication infrastructure on which modern forces depend. A force with a higher tooth-to-tail ratio may have more combat troops, but each will be less effective. The tooth-to-tail ratio of the US military has varied widely in its different conflicts.

References

Sources
Den Beste, Steven (May 19, 2003). "The Digital Warrior: A tribute to the men who make the Information Age military work"

Further reading
 

Military slang and jargon